Mike Thomas (born September 2, 1969) is a former Major League Baseball pitcher.

College 
Thomas played baseball at the collegiate level at Labette Community College.

Baseball career 
Thomas was drafted in the twenty-third round of the 1989 Major League Baseball Draft by the New York Mets. In 1991, he was traded along with Ron Darling to the Montreal Expos for Tim Burke. Later that year, he was selected in the rule 5 draft by the Cleveland Indians. He was returned to the Expos by the Indians the following year. In 1993, he signed as a free agent with the Milwaukee Brewers organization. He was a member of the team at the Major League level in 1995.

References

External links

Milwaukee Brewers players
Major League Baseball pitchers
1969 births
Living people
Baseball players from Sacramento, California
Kingsport Mets players
Gulf Coast Mets players
Pittsfield Mets players
Columbia Mets players
Sumter Flyers players
Rockford Expos players
Harrisburg Senators players
West Palm Beach Expos players
El Paso Diablos players
New Orleans Zephyrs players